The tallest structures in the U.S. state of Missouri include a  broadcasting tower, an  chimney, a  monument, and a  office building.

Missouri's tallest accessible buildings

Missouri's tallest structures

Missouri's tallest chimneys

History of Missouri's tallest habitable buildings

See also
List of tallest buildings in Kansas City, Missouri
List of tallest buildings in St. Louis
List of tallest buildings in Columbia, Missouri
List of tallest buildings by U.S. state and territory
List of tallest buildings in the United States

Tallest
Missouri